1-Nitropropane (1-NP) is a solvent.  It is a colorless liquid, an isomer of 2-nitropropane (2-NP), and classified as a nitro compound.

Preparation
1-nitropropane is produced industrially by the reaction of propane and nitric acid. This reaction forms four nitroalkanes: nitromethane, nitroethane, 1-nitropropane, and 2-nitropropane. 1-nitropropane is also a byproduct of the process for making 2-nitropropane, which is done by vapour phase nitration of propane.

Uses
Most 1-nitropropane is used as a starting material for other compounds. The other uses are solvent-based paints, solvent-based inks and adhesives, and as a solvent for chemical reactions.

Safety
1-nitropropane is toxic to humans and can cause damage to the kidneys and liver. The vapours are irritating for the lungs and eyes and the maximum exposure rate is 25 ppm. It is not known to be a carcinogen.

Reactions
1-nitropropane decomposes under the influence of heat into toxic gases. It also reacts violently with oxidizing agents and strong bases.

References

Nitroalkanes
Nitro solvents
Propyl compounds